Blood Command is a Norwegian punk band from Bergen. The band was formed in 2008 by Yngve Andersen, Silje Tombre and Sigurd Haakaas. The current lineup consists of Andersen, Haakaas, Benjamin Berge, Snorre Kilvær, and Nikki Brumen. The band has been praised for their high-energy live shows and their fresh, vibrant take on rock music, with their albums earning rave reviews from Kerrang!, Metal Hammer, and others. As of 2022, Blood Command has released four studio albums and four EPs.

Biography 
Blood Command is a Bergen punk band, started in 2008 by guitarist Yngve Andersen, vocalist Silje Tombre and drummer Sigurd Haakaas. The band first released two EPs in 2009, before their debut album Ghostlocks was released in 2010. The album was nominated for the Norwegian Grammy award Spellemannprisen in 2011. Following the release, Blood Command went on to support the Canadian hardcore band Comeback Kid on their European tour in 2011. In 2012 bassist Simon Oliver Økland joined the band for their second full-length titled Funeral Beach. The album received positive reviews both domestically and internationally from magazines such as Kerrang! and Metal Hammer, with the latter calling the band one of the best in recent years. Blood Command went on to tour as supporting acts for Protest the Hero, Gallows, and Biffy Clyro. Following the release of Funeral Beach and extensive touring in support of the release, founding member and vocalist Tombre quit the band in 2014. When interviewed for their next full-length release in 2017, Yngve stated that he had spotted Blood Command's next vocalist Karina Ljone while on the bus in 2013 and knew instantly that she would be a good replacement.

The band's third album, and first with new vocalist Ljone, followed in 2017. Cult Drugs was met with positive reviews from critics, with a 9/10 score from both Metal Hammer and Ox Magazine, and a perfect score from Kerrang. The band toured extensively in support of the album, while bassist Økland would leave the band in 2019. Blood Command followed up Cult Drugs the same year with a seven-track EP titled Return of the Arsonist. The release received positive reviews from magazines such as Kerrang and Distorted Sound. Songwriter Andersen noted that the title track is a sequel to their 2011 track "Summon The Arsonist" off the Hand Us the Alpha Male! EP: "A gift from us to our most loyal fans who have been with us since the beginning". Blood Command joined fellow Norwegians Kvelertak on tour in early 2020, which came to a halt due to the COVID-19 pandemic. During the lockdown in Norway, the band announced in April that current vocalist Ljone would be leaving due to pregnancy. In June 2021, ex-Pagan vocalist Nikki Brumen was announced as the new vocalist of the band. Alongside the announcement, the band released a new single titled "A Villain's Monologue", while a second single, "The End is Her", followed up a few months later. Both singles were accompanied by music videos that notably featured separate filming locations as Brumen was still located in Melbourne, Australia. The band's fourth album Praise Armageddonism was released on 1 July 2022, with Kerrang! commenting that "Blood Command’s creative rebirth is certainly something of a revelation".

Style
Musically, the band has referenced artists like Refused and Boney M. as their main inspirations when writing, alongside other acts like The Clash with founding member Yngve adding: “We’re making a sonic revolution you can dance to!”. Yngve has further stated the band is: "a blissful mix of R&B, punk and a little disco, as it always has been. - And two percent metal." Lyrically the band has found inspiration from rave culture, cults such as Heaven's Gate, and the increasing political manipulation taking place in both Europe and the US.

Discography

Albums 

 Ghostclocks, Fysisk Format, 2010
 Funeral Beach, Fysisk Format, 2012
 Cult Drugs, Fysisk Format, 2017
 Praise Armageddonism Hassle Records, July 1, 2022

EPs 

 Five Inches of a Car Accident, Loyal Blood, 2009
 Party All the Way to the Hospital, Fysisk Format, 2009
 Hand Us the Alpha Male!, Fysisk Format, 2011
 Return of the Arsonist, Fysisk Format, 2019

Singles 

 Cult of the New Beat, 2012
 High Five For Life, 2012
 Here Next to Murderous, 2012
 Cult Drugs, 2017
 Quitters Don't Smoke, 2017
 (The World Covered In) Purple Shrouds, Fysisk Format, 2017
 Nervous Laughter, Fysisk Format, 2017
 Afraid Of Water, Fysisk Format, 2019
 S01E02.Return.Of.The.Arsonist.720p.HDTV.x264, Fysisk Format, 2019
 Saturday City, Hassle Records, 2020
 A Villiain's Monologue, Hassle Records, 2021
 The End is Her, Hassle Records, 2021
 Nuns, Guns & Cowboys Hassle Records, 2022

Awards & Nominations

Spellemannprisen 

 2010: Best rock album (Nominated)

References 

Norwegian punk rock groups